is a railway station operated by the Kominato Railway Company's Kominato Line, located in Ichihara, Chiba Prefecture, Japan. It is 32.3 kilometers from the western terminus of the Kominato Line at Goi Station.

History
Kazusa-Ōkubo Station was opened on May 16, 1928. It has been unattended since 1956.

Lines
Kominato Railway Company
Kominato Line

Station layout
Kazusa-Ōkubo Station has a single side platform serving bidirectional traffic. There is a small rain shelter built on the platform, but no station building.

Platforms

Adjacent stations

External links
  Kominato Railway Company home page

Railway stations in Japan opened in 1928
Railway stations in Chiba Prefecture